An overhead join is a conventional method for an aircraft to approach and safely land at an airfield. It helps a pilot to integrate with any air traffic pattern near an airfield, join any circuit, and land.

Aircraft may arrive at the landing site from any direction, so a safe means of integrating into existing traffic and aligning with the runway is required. The overhead join is the standard method used in the UK, South Africa and other Commonwealth countries at smaller airports by general aviation aircraft flying under the visual flight rules (VFR), and especially at airfields with no regular radio service.

Prior to arrival, the pilot might talk with air traffic control (ATC) over the radio to establish the runway in use, the circuit height and direction (left or right hand), and the  QFE (atmospheric pressure) of the field. If the airfield is not equipped with ATC or radio, the pilot will establish these things before arrival by contacting the airfield prior to departure, or by using weather forecasts and the like. 

This information is verified on arrival by overflying the airfield and looking out for the wind direction indications from a wind sock, smoke from fires, etc., or any ground signals in the signals square (if present). This involves positioning the aircraft so that it is flying across the direction of the runway and typically at  higher than the circuit pattern for the airfield. 

With no traffic in circuit, the circuit is joined by crossing the upwind threshold and then turning downwind. With other traffic present in the circuit, the aircraft might be positioned downwind in the circuit behind or between other traffic in order to land in turn. 

Alternatives to the overhead join are to directly join the circuit by entering at a suitable corner, or a straight-in approach. If available, ATC will negotiate with the pilot which is the most appropriate method according to the current traffic situation.

See also 
 Standard Overhead Join 3-D diagram
 Standard Overhead Join poster reference

Air traffic control
Aircraft operations